The fundamentalist–modernist controversy is a major schism that originated in the 1920s and 1930s within the Presbyterian Church in the United States of America. At issue were foundational disputes about the role of Christianity; the authority of the Bible; and the death, resurrection, and atoning sacrifice of Jesus Christ. Two broad factions within Protestantism emerged: fundamentalists, who insisted upon the timeless validity of each doctrine of Christian orthodoxy; and modernists, who advocated a conscious adaptation of the Christian faith in response to the new scientific discoveries and moral pressures of the age. At first, the schism was limited to Reformed churches and centered around the Princeton Theological Seminary which had fundamentalist faculty members found Westminster Theological Seminary when Princeton went in a liberal direction. However, it soon spread, affecting nearly every Protestant denomination in the United States. Denominations that were not initially affected, such as the Lutheran churches, eventually were embroiled in the controversy, leading to a schism in the United States.

By the end of the 1930s, proponents of theological liberalism had, at the time, effectively won the debate, with the modernists in control of all mainline Protestant seminaries, publishing houses, and denominational hierarchies in the United States. More conservative Christians withdrew from the mainstream, founding their own publishing houses (such as Zondervan), universities (such as Biola University), and seminaries (such as Dallas Theological Seminary and Fuller Theological Seminary). This would remain the state of affairs until the 1970s, when conservative Protestantism emerged on a larger scale in the United States, resulting in the rise of conservatism among the Southern Baptists, Presbyterians, and others.

Background

Early controversies in Presbyterianism

American Presbyterianism had gone into schism twice in the past, and these divisions were important precursors to the fundamentalist–modernist controversy. The first was the Old Side–New Side controversy, which occurred during the First Great Awakening and resulted in the Presbyterian Church in 1741 being divided into an Old Side and New Side. The two churches reunified in 1758. The second was the Old School–New School controversy, which occurred in the wake of the Second Great Awakening and which saw the Presbyterian Church split into two denominations starting in 1836–38.

In 1857, the New School Presbyterians divided over slavery, with the southern New School Presbyterians forming the United Synod of the Presbyterian Church. In 1861, the Old School Presbyterians split, with the Southern Presbyterians taking on the name the Presbyterian Church of the Confederate States of America (PCCSA). In 1864, the United Synod merged with PCCSA, with the Southern New School Presbyterians ultimately being absorbed into an Old School denomination. In 1869, the Northern New School Presbyterians returned to the Presbyterian Church of the United States of America.

Although the controversies involved many other issues, the overarching issue had to do with the nature of church authority and the authority of the Westminster Confession of Faith. The New Side/New School opposed a rigid interpretation of the Westminster Confession. Their stance was based on spiritual renewal/revival through an experience with the Holy Spirit based on scripture. Therefore, they placed less emphasis on receiving a seminary education and the Westminster Confession (to the degree Old Side/Old School required). Their emphasis was more on the authority of scripture and a conversion experience, rather than on the Westminster Confession. They argued the importance of an encounter with God mediated by the Holy Spirit. They saw the Old Side/Old School as being formalists who fetishized the Westminster Confession and Calvinism.

The Old Side/Old School responded that the Westminster Confession was the foundational constitutional document of the Presbyterian Church and that since the Confession was simply a summary of the Bible's teachings, the church had a responsibility to ensure that its ministers' preaching was in line with the Confession. They accused the New Side/New School of being lax about the purity of the church and willing to allow Arminianism, unitarianism, and other errors to be taught in the Presbyterian Church. They criticized the New Side/School's revivals as being emotionally manipulative and shallow. Another major division had to do with their attitude towards other denominations: New Siders/Schoolers were willing to set up parachurch ministries to conduct evangelism and missions and were willing to cooperate with non-Presbyterians in doing so. The Old Siders/Schoolers felt that evangelism and missions should be conducted through agencies managed by the denomination and not involving outsiders, since it would involve a watering down of the church's theological distinctives. The two sides also had different attitudes towards their seminary professors: Princeton Theological Seminary, the leading institution of the Old School, demanded credal subscription and dedicated a large part of its academic theology to the defense of Calvinist orthodoxy; while the New School's Union Theological Seminary was more willing to allow non-Presbyterians to teach at the school and was more broadminded in its academic output.

The rise of higher criticism and the Briggs Affair, 1880–93

American Presbyterians first became aware of higher criticism (the historical-critical method) as a development of the German academy. Between 1829 and 1850, the Princeton Review, the leading Old School theological journal under the editorship of Charles Hodge, published 70 articles against higher criticism, and the number increased in the years after 1850. However, it was not until the years after 1880 that higher criticism really had any advocates within American seminaries. When higher criticism arrived, it arrived in force.

The first major proponent of higher criticism within the Presbyterian Church was Charles Augustus Briggs, who had studied higher criticism in Germany (in 1866). His inaugural address upon being made Professor of Hebrew at Union Theological Seminary in 1876 was the first salvo of higher criticism within American Presbyterianism. Briggs was active in founding The Presbyterian Review in 1880, with Archibald Alexander Hodge, president of Princeton Theological Seminary, initially serving as Briggs' co-editor. In 1881, Briggs published an article in defense of William Robertson Smith which led to a series of responses and counter-responses between Briggs and the Princeton theologians in the pages of The Presbyterian Review. In 1889, B. B. Warfield became co-editor and refused to publish one of Briggs' articles, a key turning point.

In 1891, Briggs was appointed as Union's first-ever professor of Biblical theology. His inaugural address, entitled "The Authority of Holy Scripture", proved to be highly controversial. Whereas previously, higher criticism had seemed a fairly technical, scholarly issue, Briggs now spelt out its full implications. In the address, he announced that higher criticism had now definitively proven that Moses did not write the Pentateuch; that Ezra did not write Ezra, Chronicles or Nehemiah; Jeremiah did not write the books of Kings or the Lamentations; David did not write most of the Psalms; Solomon wrote not the Song of Solomon or Ecclesiastes but only a few Proverbs; and Isaiah did not write half of the book of Isaiah. The Old Testament was merely a historical record that showed man in a lower state of moral development, with modern man having progressed morally far beyond Noah, Abraham, Jacob, Judah, David, and Solomon. At any rate, according to Briggs, the Scriptures as a whole were riddled with errors and the doctrine of scriptural inerrancy taught at Princeton Theological Seminary "is a ghost of modern evangelicalism to frighten children." Not only was the Westminster Confession in error but also the very foundation of the Confession, the Bible, could not be used to create theological absolutes. He now called on other rationalists in the denomination to join him in sweeping away the dead orthodoxy of the past and work for the unity of the entire church.

The inaugural address provoked widespread outrage in the denomination and led Old Schoolers in the denomination to move against him, with Francis Landey Patton taking the lead. Under the terms of the reunion of 1869, General Assembly had earned the right to veto all appointments to seminary professorships so at the 1891 General Assembly, held in Detroit, Old Schoolers successfully raised a motion to veto Briggs' appointment, which passed by a vote of 449–60. The faculty of Union Theological Seminary, however, refused to remove Briggs, saying that it would be a violation of scholarly freedom. In October 1892, the faculty would vote to withdraw from the denomination.

In the meantime, New York Presbytery brought heresy charges against Briggs, but these were defeated by a vote of 94–39. The committee that had brought the charges then appealed to the 1892 General Assembly, held in Portland, Oregon. The General Assembly responded with its famous Portland Deliverance, affirming that the Presbyterian Church holds that the Bible is without error and that ministers who believe otherwise should withdraw from the ministry. Briggs' case was remanded to New York Presbytery, which conducted a second heresy trial for Briggs in late 1892, and in early 1893 again found Briggs not guilty of heresy. Again, Briggs' opponents appealed to General Assembly, which in 1893 was held in Washington, D.C. The General Assembly now voted to overturn the New York decision and declared Briggs guilty of heresy. He was defrocked as a result (but only briefly since, in 1899, the Episcopal bishop of New York, Henry C. Potter, ordained him as an Episcopal priest.)

The aftermath of the Briggs Affair, 1893–1900
There was no subsequent attempt to ferret out followers of Higher Criticism in the years following the Portland Deliverance and the de-frocking of Briggs. Most followers of Higher Criticism were like the 87 clergymen who had signed the Plea for Peace and Work manifesto drafted by Henry van Dyke, which argued that all these heresy trials were bad for the church and that the church should be less concerned with theories about inerrancy and more concerned with getting on with its spiritual work. Indeed, it is probably fair to say that most clergymen in the period took the moderate view, being willing to tolerate Higher Criticism within the church because they were open to the points Higher Criticism was making or they wanted to avoid the distraction and dissension of heresy trials. For many, that came out of the traditional New School resistance to heresy trials and the rigid imposition of the Confession.

There were two further heresy trials in subsequent years, which would be the last major heresy trials in the history of the Presbyterian Church in the United States of America. In late 1892, Henry Preserved Smith, Professor of Old Testament at Lane Theological Seminary, was convicted of heresy by the Presbytery of Cincinnati for teaching that there were errors in the Bible, and, upon appeal, his conviction was upheld by the General Assembly of 1894.

In 1898, Union Theological Seminary Professor of Church History Arthur Cushman McGiffert was tried by New York Presbytery, which condemned certain portions of his book A History of Christianity in the Apostolic Age, but declined to apply sanctions. This decision was appealed to General Assembly, but McGiffert quietly resigned from the denomination and the charges were withdrawn.

The movement to revise the Westminster Confession of Faith, 1900–1910
Henry van Dyke, a modernist who had been a major supporter of Briggs in 1893, now headed a movement of modernists and New Schoolers to revise the Westminster Confession of Faith. Since 1889, Van Dyke had been calling for credal revision to affirm that all dying infants (not just elect dying infants) go to heaven, to say that God loved the whole world (not just the elect), and to affirm that Christ atoned for all mankind, not just the elect. In 1901, he chaired a 25-man committee (with a New School majority). Also in 1901, he drew up a non-binding summary of the church's faith. It mentioned neither biblical inerrancy nor reprobation, affirmed God's love of all mankind, and denied that the Pope was the Antichrist. It was adopted by General Assembly in 1902 and ratified by the presbyteries in 1904.

As a result of the changes, the Arminian-leaning Cumberland Presbyterian Church petitioned for reunification, and in 1906, over 1000 Cumberland Presbyterian ministers joined the Presbyterian Church in the USA. The arrival of so many liberal ministers strengthened the New School's position in the church.

The Doctrinal Deliverance of 1910 (the Five Fundamentals)
In 1909, there was heated debate in the New York Presbytery about whether or not to ordain three men who refused to assent to the doctrine of the virgin birth of Jesus. (They did not deny the doctrine outright but said that they were not prepared to affirm it.) The majority eventually ordained the men; the minority complained to the General Assembly, and it was that complaint that would form the basis of the subsequent controversy.

Under the order of the Presbyterian Church in the USA, the General Assembly was not authorized to accept or dismiss the complaint. It should have demitted the complaint to the presbytery and could have done so with instructions that the presbytery hold a heresy trial. The result of the trial could then be appealed to the Synod of New York and from there to the General Assembly. However, the 1910 General Assembly, acting outside its scope of authority, dismissed the complaint against the three men and at the same time instructed its Committee on Bills and Overtures to prepare a statement for governing future ordinations. The committee reported, and the General Assembly passed the Doctrinal Deliverance of 1910, which declared that five doctrines were "necessary and essential" to the Christian faith:
 The inspiration of the Bible by the Holy Spirit and the inerrancy of Scripture as a result of this.
 The virgin birth of Christ.
 The belief that Christ's death was an atonement for sin.
 The bodily resurrection of Christ.
 The historical reality of Christ's miracles.

The five propositions would become known to history as the "Five Fundamentals" and by the late 1910s, theological conservatives rallying around the Five Fundamentals came to be known as "fundamentalists."

The Fundamentals and "Back to Fundamentals"

In 1910, a wealthy Presbyterian layman, Lyman Stewart, the founder of Union Oil and a proponent of dispensationalism as taught in the newly published Scofield Reference Bible, decided to use his wealth to sponsor a series of pamphlets to be entitled The Fundamentals: A Testimony to the Truth. These twelve pamphlets published between 1910 and 1915 eventually included 90 essays written by 64 authors from several denominations. The series was conservative and critical of Higher Criticism but also broad in its approach, and the scholars who contributed articles included several Presbyterian moderates who would later be opposed to "fundamentalism" such as Charles R. Erdman Sr. and Robert Elliott Speer. It was apparently from the title of the pamphlets that the term "fundamentalist" was coined, with the first reference to the term being an article by Northern Baptist editor Curtis Lee Laws.

In 1915, the conservative magazine The Presbyterian published a conservative manifesto that had been in circulation within the denomination entitled "Back to Fundamentals". Liberal Presbyterian magazines replied that if conservatives wanted a fight, they should bring heresy charges in the church's courts or keep quiet. No charges were brought.

It is worth pointing out that the only people who actually embraced the name "fundamentalist" during the 1910s were committed dispensationalists, who elevated the premillennial return of Christ to the status of a fundamental of the Christian faith. None of the "fundamentalist" leaders (Machen, Van Til, Macartney) in the Presbyterian Church were dispensationalists.

Ecumenism, 1908–21

Several leading Presbyterians, notably Robert E. Speer, played a role in founding the Federal Council of Churches in 1908. This organization (which received 5% of its first year's budget from John D. Rockefeller Jr.) was heavily associated with the Social Gospel, and with the Progressive movement more broadly. The Council's Social Creed of the Churches was adopted by the Presbyterian Church in 1910, but conservatives in General Assembly were able to resist endorsing most of the Council's specific proposals, except for those calling for Prohibition and sabbath laws.

In response to World War I, the FCC established the General War-Time Commission to coordinate the work of Protestant, Catholic, and Jewish programs related to the war and work closely with the Department of War. It was chaired by Speer and liberal Union Theological Seminary professor William Adams Brown. Following the war, they worked hard to build on this legacy of unity. The Presbyterian Board of Foreign Missions consequently called for a meeting of Protestant leaders on the topic and in early 1919 the Interchurch World Movement (IWM) was established with John Mott as its chairman. The Executive Committee of the Presbyterian Church offered millions of dollars worth of support to help the IWM with fundraising. When the IWM collapsed financially, the denomination was on the hook for millions of dollars.

However, the debate between modernists and conservatives over the issue of the IWM was small compared to the Church Union debate. In 1919, the General Assembly sent a delegation to a national ecumenical convention that was proposing church union, and in 1920, General Assembly approved a recommendation which included "organic union" with 17 other denominations – the new organization, to be known as the United Churches of Christ in America, would be a sort of "federal government" for member churches: denominations would maintain their distinctive internal identities, but the broader organization would be in charge of things like missions and lobbying for things like prohibition. Under the terms of presbyterian polity, the measure would have to be approved by the presbyteries to take effect.

The plans for Church Union were roundly denounced by the Old School Princeton Theological Seminary faculty. It was at this point in 1920 that Princeton professor J. Gresham Machen first gained prominence within the denomination as a fundamentalist opponent of Church Union, which he argued would destroy Presbyterian distinctives, and effectively cede control of the denomination to modernists and their New School allies. However, chinks were starting to show in the Princeton faculty's armor. Charles Erdman and the president of the seminary, William Robinson, came out in favor of the union.

Ultimately, the presbyteries defeated church union by a vote of 150–100 in 1921.

"Shall the Fundamentalists Win?" (1922)

The splits between fundamentalists and modernists had been bubbling in the Presbyterian Church for some time. The event which was to bring the issue to a head was Harry Emerson Fosdick's sermon of May 21, 1922, "“Shall the Fundamentalists Win?”"  Fosdick was ordained as a Baptist, but had been given special permission to preach in First Presbyterian Church in New York City.

In this sermon, Fosdick presented the liberals in both the Presbyterian and Baptist denominations as sincere evangelical Christians who were struggling to reconcile new discoveries in history, science, and religion with the Christian faith. Fundamentalists, on the other hand, were cast as intolerant conservatives who refused to deal with these new discoveries and had arbitrarily drawn the line as to what was off limits in religious discussion. Many people, Fosdick argued, simply found it impossible to accept the virgin birth of Christ, the doctrine of substitutionary atonement, or the literal Second Coming of Christ in the light of modern science. Given the different points of view within the church, only tolerance and liberty could allow for these different perspectives to co-exist in the church.

Fosdick's sermon was re-packaged as "The New Knowledge and the Christian Faith" and quickly published in three religious journals, and then distributed as a pamphlet to every Protestant clergyman in the country.

Conservative Clarence E. Macartney, pastor of Arch Street Presbyterian Church in Philadelphia, responded to Fosdick with a sermon of his own, entitled "Shall Unbelief Win?" which was quickly published in a pamphlet. He argued that liberalism had been progressively "secularizing" the church and, if left unchecked, would lead to "a Christianity of opinions and principles and good purposes, but a Christianity without worship, without God, and without Jesus Christ."

Led by Macartney, the Presbytery of Philadelphia requested that the General Assembly direct the Presbytery of New York to take such actions as to ensure that the teaching and preaching in the First Presbyterian Church of New York City conform to the Westminster Confession of Faith. This request would lead to over a decade of bitter wrangling in the Presbyterian Church.

Throughout the proceedings, Fosdick's defense was led by lay elder John Foster Dulles.

William Jennings Bryan and the General Assembly of 1923

Background: Darwinism and Christianity
A giant of Old School Presbyterianism at Princeton, Charles Hodge, was one of the few Presbyterian controversialists to turn their guns on Darwinism prior to World War I. Hodge published his What is Darwinism? in 1874, three years after The Descent of Man was published, and argued that if Charles Darwin's theory excluded the design argument, it was effectively atheism and could not be reconciled with biblical Christianity.

Asa Gray responded that Christianity was compatible with Darwin's science. Both he and many other Christians accepted various forms of theistic evolution, and Darwin had not excluded the work of the Creator as a primary cause.

Most churchmen, however, took a far more prosaic attitude. In the early period, it must have appeared far from clear that Darwin's theory of natural selection would come to be hegemonic among scientists, as refutations and alternate systems were still being proposed and debated. Then, when evolution became widely accepted, most churchmen were far less concerned with refuting it than they were with establishing schemes whereby Darwinism could be reconciled with Christianity. This was true even among prominent Old Schoolers at Princeton Theological Seminary such as Charles Hodge's successors A. A. Hodge and B. B. Warfield who came to endorse the ideas now described as theistic evolution.

William Jennings Bryan

William Jennings Bryan, a former lawyer who had been brought up in the Arminian Cumberland Presbyterian Church (part of which would merge with the PC-USA in 1906) and who was also a Presbyterian ruling elder, was elected to Congress in 1890, then became the Democratic presidential candidate for three unsuccessful presidential bids in 1896, 1900, and 1908. After his 1900 defeat, Bryan re-examined his life and concluded that he had let his passion for politics obscure his calling as a Christian. Beginning in 1900, he began lecturing on the Chautauqua circuit, where his speeches often involved religious as well as political themes. For the next 25 years until his death, Bryan was one of the most popular Chautauqua lecturers and he spoke in front of hundreds of thousands of people.

By 1905, Bryan had concluded that Darwinism and the modernism of Higher Criticism were allies in promoting liberalism within the church, thereby in his view undermining the foundations of Christianity. In lectures from 1905, Bryan spoke out against the spread of Darwinism, which he characterized as involving "the operation of the law of hate – the merciless law by which the strong crowd out and kill off the weak", and warned that it could undermine the foundations of morality. In 1913 he became Woodrow Wilson's secretary of state, then resigned in 1915 because he believed that the Wilson administration was about to enter World War I in response to the sinking of the RMS Lusitania and he opposed American intervention in a European war.

When the US did finally join World War I in 1917, Bryan volunteered for the army, though he was never allowed to enlist. At a time of widespread revulsion at alleged German atrocities, Bryan linked evolution to Germany, and claimed that Darwinism provided a justification for the strong to dominate the weak and was therefore the source of German militarism. He drew on reports by the entomologist Vernon Kellogg of German officers discussing the Darwinian rationale for their declaration of war, and the sociologist Benjamin Kidd's book The Science of Power which contended that Nietzsche's philosophy represented an interpretation of Darwinism, to conclude that Nietzsche's and Darwin's ideas were the impetus for German nationalism and militarism. Bryan argued that Germany's militarism and "barbarism" came from their belief that the "struggle for survival" described in Darwin's On the Origin of Species applied to nations as well as to individuals, and that "The same science that manufactured poisonous gases to suffocate soldiers is preaching that man has a brute ancestry and eliminating the miraculous and the supernatural from the Bible."

Bryan was, in essence, fighting what would later be called social Darwinism, social and economic ideas owing as much to Herbert Spencer and Thomas Malthus as to Darwin, and viewed by modern biologists as a misuse of his theory. Germany, or so Bryan's argument ran, had replaced Christ's teachings with Nietzsche's philosophy based on ideas of survival of the fittest, and the implication was that America would suffer the same fate if unchecked. This fear was reinforced by the report of the psychologist James H. Leuba's 1916 study indicating that a considerable number of college students lost their faith during the four years they spent in college.

Bryan launched his campaign against Darwinism in 1921 when he was invited to give the James Sprunt Lectures at Virginia's Union Theological Seminary. At the end of one, The Menace of Darwinism, he said that "Darwinism is not a science at all; it is a string of guesses strung together" and that there is more science in the Bible's "And God said, Let the earth bring forth the living creature ..." than in all of Darwin. These lectures were published and became a national bestseller.

Now that Bryan had linked Darwinism and Higher Criticism as the twin evils facing the Presbyterian Church, Harry Emerson Fosdick responded by defending Darwinism, as well as Higher Criticism, from Bryan's attack. In the early 1920s, Bryan and Fosdick squared off against each other in a series of articles and replies in the pages of the New York Times.

The General Assembly of 1923
In these circumstances, when General Assembly met in 1923 in Indianapolis, Bryan was determined to strike against Darwinism and against Fosdick, so he organized a campaign to have himself elected as Moderator of the General Assembly. He lost the election by a vote of 451–427 to the Rev. Charles F. Wishart, president of the College of Wooster, a strong proponent of allowing evolution to be taught at Presbyterian-run colleges and universities.

Undaunted, Bryan took to opposing Darwinism on the floor of the General Assembly, the first time General Assembly had debated the matter. He proposed a resolution that the denomination should cease payments to any school, college, or university where Darwinism was taught. Opponents argued that there were plenty of Christians in the church who believed in evolution. Ultimately, Bryan could not convince even Machen to back his position, and the Assembly simply approved a resolution condemning materialistic (as opposed to theistic) evolutionary philosophy.

The major question dealt with at the General Assembly of 1923 was not, however, Darwinism. It was the question of what to do about Harry Emerson Fosdick and his provocative sermon of the previous year. The Committee on Bills and Overtures recommended that the assembly declare its continuing commitment to the Westminster Confession, but leave the matter to New York Presbytery, which was investigating. The Committee's minority report recommended a declaration re-affirming the denomination's commitment to the Five Fundamentals of 1910 and to require New York Presbytery to force First Presbyterian Church to conform to the Westminster Confession. A fiery debate ensued, with Bryan initially seeking a compromise to drop the prosecution of Fosdick in exchange for a reaffirmation of the Five Fundamentals. When this proved impossible, he lobbied intensely for the minority report, and was successful in having the minority report adopted by a vote of 439–359.

Even before the end of General Assembly, this decision was controversial. 85 commissioners filed an official protest, arguing that the Fosdick case was not properly before the General Assembly, and that, as the General Assembly was a court, not a legislative body, the Five Fundamentals could not be imposed upon church officers without violating the constitution of the church. At the same time, Henry Sloane Coffin of Madison Avenue Presbyterian Church in New York City issued a statement saying that he did not accept the Five Fundamentals and that if Fosdick were removed from his pulpit, they would need to get rid of him too.

The Auburn Affirmation (1923–24)

Even before the General Assembly of 1923, Robert Hastings Nichols, a history professor at Auburn Theological Seminary was circulating a paper in which he argued that the Old School-New School reunion of 1870 and the merger with the Cumberland Presbyterian Church of 1906 had created a church specifically designed to accommodate doctrinal diversity.

Two weeks after the General Assembly of 1923, 36 clergymen met in Syracuse, New York, and, using Nichols' paper as a base, ultimately issued a declaration known to history as the Auburn Affirmation.

The Auburn Affirmation opened by affirming the Westminster Confession of Faith, but argued that within American Presbyterianism, there had been a long tradition of freedom of interpretation of the Scriptures and the Confession. The General Assembly's issuance of the Five Fundamentals not only eroded this tradition, but it flew in the face of the Presbyterian Church's constitution, which required all doctrinal changes be approved by the presbyteries. While some members of the church could regard the Five Fundamentals as a satisfactory explanation of Scriptures and the Confession, there were others who could not, and therefore, the Presbyteries should be free to hold to whatever theories they saw fit in interpreting Scripture and the Confession.

The Auburn Affirmation was circulated beginning in November 1923 and ultimately signed by 174 clergymen. In January 1924, it was released to the press, along with the names of 150 signatories.

The General Assembly of 1924

Conservative activities prior to the 1924 General Assembly
The most significant conservative preparation for the General Assembly of 1924 actually occurred slightly before the 1923 General Assembly. This was the publication of J. Gresham Machen's Christianity and Liberalism. In this book, Machen argued that liberalism, far from being a set of teachings that could be accommodated within the church, was in fact antithetical to the principles of Christianity and was currently engaged in a struggle against historic Christianity.

Liberal activities prior to the 1924 General Assembly
New York Presbytery, which had been ordered by General Assembly to deal with Fosdick, adopted a report that essentially exonerated Fosdick of any wrongdoing.

In June 1923, New York Presbytery ordained two men—Henry P. Van Dusen and Cedric O. Lehman — who refused to affirm the virgin birth.

On December 31, 1923, Henry van Dyke publicly relinquished his pew at First Presbyterian Church, Princeton as a protest against Machen's fundamentalist preaching. Van Dyke would ultimately return to his pew in December 1924 when Charles Erdman replaced Machen in the pulpit.

In May 1924, the Auburn Affirmation was republished, along with supplementary materials, and now listing 1,274 signatories.

Convening the Assembly
General Assembly met in Grand Rapids, Michigan in May 1924. During the campaign for moderator, William Jennings Bryan threw his weight behind Clarence E. Macartney (the Philadelphia minister who was instrumental in bringing charges against Fosdick), who narrowly beat out moderate Princeton Theological Seminary faculty member Charles Erdman by a vote of 464–446. Macartney named Bryan his vice-moderator.

No action was taken at this General Assembly about the Auburn Affirmation. The ordination of Van Dusen and Lehman was referred to the Synod of New York for "appropriate action."

On the question of Harry Fosdick, moderates in 1924 steered debate away from his theology and towards matter of polity. As Fosdick was a Baptist, General Assembly instructed First Presbyterian Church, New York to invite Fosdick to join the Presbyterian Church, and if he would not, to get rid of him. Fosdick refused to join the Presbyterian Church and ultimately resigned from his post at First Presbyterian Church in October.

The General Assembly of 1925

At the 1925 General Assembly, held in Columbus, Ohio, the denomination seemed determined to put the Fosdick controversy behind them. Charles R. Erdman was elected as moderator, which was widely seen as a blow against the fundamentalists. Erdman, a professor at Princeton Theological Seminary, had been engaged in a series of debates with J. Gresham Machen and Clarence Macartney throughout the year, and in spring 1925, he was ousted as Princeton Seminary's student advisor for being insufficiently enthusiastic about the League of Evangelical Students, set up as a counterweight to more liberal intervarsity organizations. Erdman was himself theologically conservative, but was more concerned with pursuing "purity and peace and progress" (his slogan during the election for moderator) than he was with combatting liberalism. Machen felt that men like Erdman would ultimately be responsible for agnostic Modernism triumphing in the Presbyterian Church.

It seemed to many observers that the licensing of Van Dusen and Lehman was likely to cause a split in the church.  General Assembly required all candidates to the ministry to affirm the virgin birth and returned the matter to New York Presbytery for proper proceedings. In response, the New York commissioners, led by Henry Sloane Coffin protested that General Assembly had no right to change or add to the conditions for entrance to the ministry beyond those affirmed in the reunions of 1870 and 1906. Coffin and the liberals were prepared to walk out of the Assembly and take their churches out of the denomination rather than submit to the further "Bryanizing of the Presbyterian Church." A special commission of fifteen was appointed to study the constitutional issues involved. Erdman was able to convince Coffin not to leave the denomination, arguing that, as his interpretation of the constitution was the correct one, he would prevail when the Special Commission issued its report.

The Scopes trial (1925)

At the same time he had been campaigning against Darwinism (largely unsuccessfully) within the Presbyterian Church, William Jennings Bryan had also been encouraging state lawmakers to pass laws banning the teaching of evolution in public schools. Several states had responded to Bryan's call, including Tennessee, which passed such a law in March 1925. (Given the present-day contours of the evolution–creation debate, in many states in 1925, evolution continued to be taught in church-run institutions at the same time that its teaching was banned in state-run public schools.)

The ACLU was seeking a test case to challenge these anti-evolutionary laws. This led to the famous trial of John Scopes for teaching evolution in a public school in Dayton, Tennessee. The ACLU sent in renowned lawyer John Randolph Neal Jr. to defend Scopes.

Baptist pastor William Bell Riley, founder and president of the World Christian Fundamentals Association, persuaded William Jennings Bryan to act as its counsel. Bryan invited his major allies in the Presbyterian General Assembly to attend the trial with him, but J. Gresham Machen refused to testify, saying he had not studied biology in enough detail to testify at trial, while Clarence Macartney had a previous engagement.
In response to the announcement that Bryan would be attending the trial, renowned lawyer and committed agnostic Clarence Darrow volunteered to serve on Scopes' defense team.

The stage was thus set for a trial which would prove to be a media circus, with reporters from across the country descending on the small town of 1,900 people.

Although the prosecution of Scopes was successful, the trial is widely seen as a crucial moment in discrediting the fundamentalist movement in America, particularly after Darrow called Bryan to the stand and he appeared little able to defend his view of the Bible.

Among the media, Bryan's loudest and ultimately most influential critic was H. L. Mencken, who reported on the trial in his columns and denounced fundamentalism as irrational, backwards and intolerant.

As noted earlier, opposition to Darwinism was always much more important to Bryan than it was to other conservative Presbyterian Church leaders. Thus, following Bryan's death in 1925, the debate about evolution, while it remained an issue within church politics, never again assumed the prominence to the debate that it had while Bryan was alive. (Probably the reason why the issue of evolution has obtained such an iconic status within the popular consciousness about the fundamentalist–modernist controversy is that it represented the one point where internal church politics intersected with government, specifically public school, policy.)

The Special Commission of 1925 and the General Assembly of 1926
The Special Committee appointed at the General Assembly of 1925 consisted mainly of moderates. The committee solicited testimony from both sides, and received statements from Machen, Macartney, and Coffin.

At the 1926 General Assembly, another moderate, W.O. Thompson, was elected as moderator.

The Special Committee delivered its report on May 28. It argued that there were five major causes of unrest in the Presbyterian Church: 1) general intellectual movements, including "the so-called conflict between science and religion", naturalistic worldviews, different understandings of the nature of God, and changes in language; 2) historical differences going back to the Old School-New School split; 3) disagreements about church polity, particularly the role of General Assembly, and lack of representation of women in the church; 4) theological changes; and 5) misunderstanding. The report went on to conclude that the Presbyterian system had traditionally allowed a diversity of views when the core of truth was identical; and that the church flourished when it focused on its unity of spirit. Toleration of doctrinal diversity, including in how to interpret the Westminster Confession, was to be encouraged. In short, the report essentially affirmed the views of the Auburn Affirmation. The committee affirmed that General Assembly could not amend the Westminster Confession without the permission of the presbyteries, though it could issue judicial rulings consistent with the Confession that were binding on the presbyteries. The Five Fundamentals, though, had no binding authority.

In spite of Clarence Macartney's opposition on the floor of General Assembly, the committee's report was adopted.

The Battle for Princeton Theological Seminary, 1926–29
Following the reunion of the Old School and New School in 1870, Princeton Theological Seminary remained the bulwark of Old School thought within the Presbyterian Church. Indeed, by 1920, it was arguably the only remaining Old School institution in the Presbyterian Church.

The majority of the faculty in 1920 remained convinced Old Schoolers, including J. Gresham Machen and Geerhardus Vos. However, to combat a perceived lack of training in practical divinity, a number of more moderate New Schoolers were brought in, including Charles Erdman and J. Ross Stevenson, who by 1920 was the president of the seminary. As stated earlier, the tension between Old Schoolers and moderates revealed itself in debates about the proposed Church Union of 1920; Machen's anti-liberal preaching which resulted in the public fall-out with Harry van Dyke; the controversy about Erdman's approach to the League of Evangelical Students; and splits about how to deal with the splits in the wider church.

By 1925, the Old School's majority on the faculty was threatened, but the selection of Clarence Macartney to replace outgoing Professor of Apologetics William Greene seemed to solidify the Old School majority on the faculty. However, when Macartney turned the job down, Machen was offered the job.

Before he could accept or refuse, however, General Assembly intervened, and in the 1926 General Assembly, moderates succeeded in securing a committee to study how to reconcile the two parties at Princeton. (The seminary was governed by a board of directors subject to the supervision of General Assembly.) (On a sidenote, some members of the General Assembly seem to have been wary of Machen because of his opposition to Prohibition.)

The committee reported back at the General Assembly of 1927, where the moderate Robert E. Speer was elected as moderator. Their report concluded that the source of the difficulties at Princeton was that some of the Princeton faculty (i.e. Machen) were trying to keep Princeton in the service of a certain party in the church rather than doing what was in the best interest of the denomination as a whole. They recommended re-organization of the seminary. General Assembly renewed the committee's mandate and ordered them to study how to re-organize the seminary.

This led Machen to declare that the 1927 General Assembly was "probably the most disastrous meeting, from the point of view of evangelical Christianity, that has been held in the whole history of our Church." Machen composed and had circulated in the denomination a document entitled "The Attack Upon Princeton Seminary: A Plea for Fair Play." He argued that Princeton was the only seminary continuing to defend orthodoxy among the older theological institutions in the English-speaking world. The loss of the seminary would be a major blow for orthodoxy. The moderates and liberals already had control of practically every seminary in the denomination: why couldn't the conservatives be left with one?

The committee reported to the 1928 General Assembly, held in Tulsa, Oklahoma, recommending re-organizing the seminary to give more powers to the president of the seminary and to replace the two ruling boards with one unified board. In response, Clarence Macartney responded that his party were prepared to take legal action to stop this from happening. Wary, General Assembly simply appointed a committee to continue studying the matter.

This committee reported to the 1929 General Assembly. Machen gave a fiery speech on the floor of General Assembly, but he could not prevent General Assembly from voting to re-organize the seminary.

Rather than contesting this decision in the courts as had been threatened, Machen now decided to set up a new seminary to be a bastion of conservative thought. This institution would become Westminster Theological Seminary (named to stress its fidelity to the Westminster Confession of Faith) and several conservatives on the Princeton faculty, including Machen, Cornelius Van Til, Robert Dick Wilson, and Oswald Thompson Allis, would leave Princeton to teach at Westminster. Clarence Macartney initially opposed setting up Westminster, arguing that conservatives should stay at Princeton where they could continue to provide an orthodox voice. Machen responded that Princeton was in a state of apostasy and that he couldn't serve alongside apostates. Macartney was eventually won over to Machen's side.

Foreign missions, 1930–36

In 1930, as a result of widespread second thoughts about missions in general, a group of Baptist laymen at the request of John D. Rockefeller Jr. concluded that it was time for a serious re-evaluation of the effectiveness of foreign missions. With Rockefeller's financial backing, they convinced seven major denominations – the Methodist Episcopal Church, the Northern Baptist Convention, the Reformed Church in America, the Congregational church, the Episcopal Church in the United States of America, the Presbyterian Church in the United States of America and the United Presbyterian Church of North America – to participate in their "Laymen's Foreign Missions Inquiry". They commissioned a study of missionaries in India, Burma, China, and Japan and launched a separate inquiry under the chairmanship of the philosopher and Harvard professor William Ernest Hocking. These two inquiries led to the publication of a one-volume summary of the findings of the Laymen's Inquiry entitled Re-Thinking Missions: A Laymen's Inquiry after One Hundred Years in 1932.

Re-Thinking Missions argued that in the face of emerging secularism, Christians should ally with other world religions, rather than struggle against them.

The seven denominations who had agreed to participate in the Laymen's Inquiry now distanced themselves from the report. The Presbyterian Board of Foreign Missions issued a statement reaffirming the board's commitment to the evangelistic basis of the missionary enterprise and to Jesus Christ as the only Lord and Savior.

Pearl S. Buck now weighed into the debate. In a review published in The Christian Century, she praised the report, saying it should be read by every Christian in America and, ironically mimicking the Biblical literalism of the fundamentalists, "I think this is the only book I have ever read that seems to me literally true in its every observation and right in its every conclusion." Then, in a November 1932 speech before a large audience at the Astor Hotel, later published in Harper's, Buck decried gauging the success of missions by the numbers of new church members. Instead she advocated humanitarian efforts to improve the agricultural, educational, medical, and sanitary conditions of the community. She described the typical missionary as "narrow, uncharitable, unappreciative, ignorant." In the Harpers article along with another in Cosmopolitan published in May 1933, Buck rejected the doctrine of original sin, saying "I believe that most of us start out wanting to do right and to be good." She asserted that belief in the virgin birth or the divinity of Christ was not a prerequisite to being a Christian. She said that the only need is to acknowledge that one cannot live without Christ and to reflect that in one's life.

Macartney quickly called on the Board of Foreign Missions, under the presidency of Charles Erdman, to denounce Re-Thinking Missions and asked for their response to Buck's statements. Erdman responded that the Board was committed to historic Evangelical standards and that they felt that Pearl S. Buck's comments were unfortunate, but he hoped she might yet be won back to the missionary cause. She would eventually resign as a Presbyterian missionary in May.

J. Gresham Machen now published a book arguing that the Board of Foreign Missions was insufficiently evangelical and particularly that its secretary, Robert E. Speer, had refused to require missionaries to subscribe to the Five Fundamentals. In New Brunswick Presbytery, Machen proposed an overture to General Assembly calling on it to ensure that in future, only solidly evangelical Christians be appointed to the Board of Foreign Missions. Machen and Speer faced off in the Presbytery, with Speer arguing that conflict and division were bad for the church — the presbytery agreed and refused to make the recommendation.

Clarence Macartney, however, was able to get a similar motion through the Presbytery of Philadelphia, so the issue came before the General Assembly of 1933. The majority report of the Standing Committee of Foreign Missions affirmed the church's adherence to the Westminster Confession; expressed its confidence that Speer and the Board shared this conviction; and repudiated Re-Thinking Missions. The minority report argued that the Board was not orthodox and proposed a slate of conservatives candidates for the Board. The majority report passed overwhelmingly.

Creation of the Independent Board for Presbyterian Foreign Missions
Disapproving of General Assembly's decision not to appoint a new slate of conservatives to the Board of Foreign Missions, J. Gresham Machen, along with H. McAllister Griffiths, announced that they were forming an Independent Board for Presbyterian Foreign Missions to truly promote biblical and Presbyterian work. Macartney refused to go along with Machen in setting up an independent missions board.

The 1934 General Assembly declared that the Independent Board violated the Presbyterian constitution and ordered the Board to cease collecting funds within the church and ordered all Presbyterian clergy and laity to sever their connections with the Board or face disciplinary action. (This motion was opposed by both Macartney and Henry Sloane Coffin as overly harsh.) Less than a month later, New Brunswick Presbytery asked Machen for his response. He replied that General Assembly's actions were illegal and that he would not shut down the Independent Board. The presbytery consequently brought charges against Machen including violation of his ordination vows and renouncing the authority of the church. A trial was held, and in March 1935, he was convicted and suspended from the ministry.

Macartney urged Machen to compromise, but he refused. In June 1935, he set up the Presbyterian Constitutional Covenant Union. In October, the split between Macartney and Machen spread to Westminster Seminary, where the faculty, led by Machen, called on the board of trustees to announce their support of the Independent Board of Foreign Missions and the Covenant Union. Thirteen trustees, including Macartney, refused to do so and resigned in 1936.

Eight ministers, including Machen, were tried in the General Assembly of 1936. They were convicted and removed from the ministry. Machen then led the Presbyterian Constitutional Covenant Union to form a new denomination, the Presbyterian Church of America, later forced to change its name to the Orthodox Presbyterian Church in 1939.

Legacy
As a result of the departure of Machen and the denominational conservatives, especially of the Old School, the shape of the Presbyterian Church in the USA as a modernist, liberal denomination was secured. The PCUSA would eventually merge with the United Presbyterian Church of North America in 1958 to form the United Presbyterian Church in the United States of America and in 1983, the UPCUSA would merge with the Presbyterian Church in the United States (the "Southern Presbyterians" who had split with the PCUSA in 1861 due to the Civil War) to form the current Presbyterian Church (USA).

The dispute between the fundamentalists and modernists would be played out in nearly every Christian denomination. By the 1920s, it was clear that every mainstream Protestant denomination was going to be willing to accommodate modernism, with the exception of the Presbyterians, Southern Baptists, and the Missouri synod Lutherans, where the situation was still unclear. The departure of Machen and other conservatives brought the Presbyterians into the camp willing to accommodate modernism, leaving the Southern Baptists and the Missouri Synod as the only large, national denominations where orthodox Protestants were still active within the denomination. The conflict continued to roil both churches for most of the 20th century and the triumph of orthodox Protestantism in those denominations would not be secure until the Seminex schism in the Lutheran church and the Southern Baptist Convention conservative resurgence of 1979–1990.

See also
 Conflict thesis
 Continuity thesis

Footnotes

Further reading
 Christianity and Liberalism by J. Gresham Machen (1923)
 The Presbyterian Conflict by Edwin H. Rian (1940)
 The Broadening Church: A Study of Theological Issues in the Presbyterian Church Since 1869 by Lefferts A. Loetscher (1954)
 A Half Century of Union Theological Seminary, 1896–1945 by Henry Sloane Coffin (1954)
 The Making of a Minister: The Autobiography of Clarence E. Macartney by Clarence E. Macartney (1961)
 Henry Sloane Coffin: The Man and His Ministry by Morgan Phelps Noyes (1964)
 Harry Emerson Fosdick: Preacher, Pastor, Prophet by Robert Moats Miller (1985)
 Harry Emerson Fosdick: Persuasive Preacher by Halford R. Ryan (1989)
 The Presbyterian Controversy: Fundamentalists, Modernists, and Moderates by Bradley J. Longfield (1991)
 Understanding Fundamentalism and Evangelicalism by George M. Marsden (1991)
 The Confessional Mosaic: Presbyterians and Twentieth-Century Theology, ed. Milton J. Coalter, John M. Mulder, and Louis B. Weeks (1991)
 The Pluralistic Vision: Presbyterians and Mainstream Protestant Education and Leadership. ed. Milton J. Coalter, John M. Mulder, and Louis B. Weeks (1992)
 Princeton Theological Seminary: A Narrative History, 1812–1982 by William K. Selden (1992)
 A Righteous Cause: The Life of William Jennings Bryan by Robert W. Cherney (1994)
 Defending the Faith: J. Gresham Machen and the Crisis of Conservative Protestantism in Twentieth-Century America by D. G. Hart (1995)
 Crossed Fingers: How the Liberals Captured the Presbyterian Church by Gary North (1996)
 Pearl S. Buck: A Cultural Biography by Peter Conn (1996)
 A Brief History of the Presbyterians by James H. Smylie (1996)
 Summer for the Gods: The Scopes Trial and America's Continuing Debate over Science and Religion by Edward J. Larson (1998)
 Toward a Sure Faith: J. Gresham Machen and the Dilemma of Biblical Criticism by Terry A. Chrisope (2001)
 The Scopes Trial: A Brief History with Documents by Jeffrey P. Moran (2002)
 Monkey Business: The True Story of the Scopes Trial by Marvin Olasky and John Perry (2005)
 A Godly Hero: The Life of William Jennings Bryan by Michael Kazin (2006)
 Fundamentalism and American Culture by George M. Marsden (2006)
 Yet Saints Their Watch Are Keeping: Fundamentalists, Modernists, and the Development of Evangelical Ecclesiology, 1887–1937 by J. Michael Utzinger (2006)

External links
 The Scofield Reference Bible (1909) (the online version is the 1917 edition)
 The Fundamentals: A Testimony to the Truth, edited by R.A. Torrey (1910–15)
 The Origins of Paul's Religion by J. Gresham Machen (1921)
 "Shall the Fundamentalists Win?" by Harry Emerson Fosdick (1922)
 "Shall Unbelief Win?" by Clarence E. Macartney (1922)
 In His Image by William Jennings Bryan (1922) at Project Gutenberg
 "Who is Fundamental?" from Time magazine (1923)
 Christianity and Liberalism by J. Gresham Machen (1923)
 The Auburn Affirmation (1924)
 H.L. Mencken's newspaper columns on the Scopes Trial (July 17–20, 1925)
 Re-Thinking Missions: A Laymen's Inquiry after One Hundred Years by William Ernest Hocking (1932) archive.org free book to read

Orthodox Presbyterian Church
Presbyterianism in the United States
Protestantism-related controversies